John Fenwick Burgoyne Blackett (1821 – 25 April 1856) was a British politician.

He was the oldest son of Christopher Blackett, a Member of Parliament (MP) for Northumberland South. John was educated at Harrow School, and in 1841 was admitted to Christ Church, Oxford (where he was President of the Oxford Union), earning a second-class degree in Classics, and was elected to a fellowship at Merton College, Oxford, in 1842. He shortly after came to London, and studied for the bar, as well as contributing to the Edinburgh Review.

He was elected as a Member of Parliament for Newcastle-upon-Tyne at the 1852 general election. He was noted for his regular and punctual attendance to Parliament, but constant hard work wore him out and he retired in 1856, resigning his seat by appointment as Steward of the Manor of Northstead. He then moved to continental Europe to try to regain some energy, dying at Villeneuve-sur-Yonne, France.

References

Sources

Further reading

External links
 

1821 births
1856 deaths
Alumni of Christ Church, Oxford
Presidents of the Oxford Union
Fellows of Merton College, Oxford
Members of Lincoln's Inn
Members of the Parliament of the United Kingdom for English constituencies
UK MPs 1852–1857
People educated at Harrow School